Losodokodon is an extinct genus of large herbivorous mammals belonging to the family Mammutidae. It was first described in 2009 by David Tab Rasmussen and Mercedes Gutiérrez from fossils found in the Erageleit Formation of northwestern Kenya. Losodokodon lived during the Late Oligocene, between 27 and 24 million years ago.

References 

Mastodons
Prehistoric placental genera
Oligocene mammals of Africa
Fossils of Kenya
Fossil taxa described in 2009